() is a poetry collection in Romanian by the Nobel Prize-winning author Herta Müller. It was first published in 2005 by Polirom.

References 

2005 poetry books
Romanian poetry collections